Kukës Island is a small island located in the north of Albania, in the Fierza Lake. The nearest city is Kukës city, around 4 kilometers from the island. Depending on the time it turns into a peninsula rather than being a stable island.

Geography 
The Kukës island has a small area of only 2.5 hectares and is far from the coast less than 100 meters. It has a small vegetation.

Lake islands of Albania
Geography of Kukës County